Quintino Fernandes Rodrigues Silva (born 1 January 1971) is a Portuguese former road cyclist. Professional from 1992 to 2004, he notably competed in two editions of the Giro d'Italia and the Vuelta a España.

Major results

1991
 7th Overall Troféu Joaquim Agostinho
1992
 5th Overall Troféu Joaquim Agostinho
1993
 3rd Overall Troféu Joaquim Agostinho
 10th Overall Volta a Portugal
1st Stage 12
1994
 1st Stage 4 Tour de Pologne
 4th Overall Escalada a Montjuïc
 6th Overall Troféu Joaquim Agostinho
1995
 1st Stage 8 Tour de Pologne
 1st Stage 3 Rapport Toer
 2nd Overall Volta a Portugal
1st Prologue (TTT)
 3rd Overall Grande Prémio Jornal de Notícias
 6th Overall Troféu Joaquim Agostinho
1996
 5th GP Villafranca de Ordizia
1997
 1st Stage 4b Tour du Poitou-Charentes
 8th Overall Volta a Portugal
1998
 9th Overall Volta ao Algarve
 10th Overall Volta a Portugal
1999
 1st Porto–Lisboa
2002
 5th Road race, National Road Championships

Grand Tour general classification results timeline

References

External links

1971 births
Living people
Portuguese male cyclists
Sportspeople from Vila Nova de Gaia